Albert Geutebrück (6 January 1801 in Gotha – 13 March 1868 in Graz, Steiermark) was a German classicist architect, especially active in Leipzig, where his works included the Augusteum.

1801 births
1868 deaths
German neoclassical architects
People from Gotha (town)
Architects from Leipzig
19th-century German architects